The 1958 Grand Prix motorcycle racing season was the tenth F.I.M. Road Racing World Championship Grand Prix season. The season consisted of seven Grand Prix races in five classes: 500cc, 350cc, 250cc, 125cc and Sidecars 500cc. It began on 6 June, with Isle of Man TT and ended with Nations Grand Prix in Italy on 14 September.

1958 Grand Prix season calendar

† The Nations Grand Prix also held a non-championship 175 cc race, won by the Italian, Francesco Villa.

Standings

Scoring system
Points were awarded to the top six finishers in each race. Only the four best races counted in 125cc, 250cc, 350cc and 500cc championships, while in the Sidecars the three best results were counted.

500cc final standings

350cc Standings

250cc Standings

125cc Standings

References
 Büla, Maurice & Schertenleib, Jean-Claude (2001). Continental Circus 1949-2000. Chronosports S.A. 

Grand Prix motorcycle racing seasons
Grand Prix motorcycle racing season